Dragutin Domjanić (12 September 1875 – 7 June 1933) was a Croatian poet.

Domjanić was born in Krči, a village near the town of Sveti Ivan Zelina.  Having graduated law, he served as a judge in Zagreb and as a counsellor for Ban's Bench. He was a member of Yugoslav Academy of Sciences and Arts, the president of Matica hrvatska (1921–1926), and the president of Yugoslav PEN Club. In a struggle between the "old" and the "young" in the framework of Croatian Modernism, he sides with the "young". He versified motifs such as spiritual love, intimacy of the nobility mansions, marquises and cavaliers of the past days. He fears the brutality of the present, mourns the world dying off, he is incredulous of new ideas.

His affection for the past directs him towards his mother tongue - Kajkavian. The most notable work of Domjanić is thus Kajkavian poem collection Kipci i popevke, and the poems "Fala" and "Popevke sam slagal", both set to music by Vlaho Paljetak. Croatian composer Ivana Lang has in a similar manner set to music several Domjanić's poems. His lyrical expression, idyllic and sentimental, abounds both by the picturesqueness and musicality. He became the first writer in Croatian literature to achieve complete and artistically mature melodiousness and rhythmicity of the Croatian Kajkavian expression.

All of his poems were written in Kajkavian literary language, although his vernacular was Kajkavian dialect of Adamovec. He also wrote a number of literary accounts, and a few prosaic notes, chiefly in the spirit of his lyrical interests and stylistic manière.

He is also the author of the lesser known "string puppet play" Petrica Kerempuh i spametni  osel, in which he provides a critical and satirical account of Croatian intellectuals in the 1920s.

Some of his poetic work has been translated into Esperanto, by Zvonko Rehoriĉ, e.g., ‘Sub suno kaj ombro’.

He died in Zagreb.

Works
 Pjesme (1909)
 Kipci i popevke (1917)
 V suncu i senci (1927)
 Po dragomu kraju (1933)

References

Sources 
 

1875 births
1933 deaths
20th-century Croatian poets
Members of the Croatian Academy of Sciences and Arts
Burials at Mirogoj Cemetery
Croatian male poets
20th-century male writers